Garcia is a plant genus of the family Euphorbiaceae and of the monotypic subtribe Garciinae, first described as a genus in 1792. It is native to Central America, Mexico, Colombia, and Venezuela, and also naturalized in some of the West Indies.

Species
 Garcia nutans Vahl ex Rohr - Mexico from Sinaloa and San Luis Potosí to Chiapas + Yucatán, Central America, Colombia, Venezuela
 Garcia parviflora Lundell - Chiapas, Tabasco, Veracruz

References

Aleuritideae
Euphorbiaceae genera